Satisfact is an American post-punk band formed in 1996 in Washington State, abridging the post-hardcore movement with the nascent post-punk revival of the 21st century.  They created 3 full-length albums which were released on K Records and Up Records.

Members
 Matt Steinke — vocals, guitar
 Josh Warren — bass
 Chad States — synthesizer
 Jeremiah Green — drums

Discography
The Unwanted Sounds of Satisfact (1996)
Satisfact (Orange album) (1997)
The Third Meeting At The Third Counter (1999)

Notes

External links
 Up Records Mocket album announcement
 Deluxe Records Artist biography 
 Band Review on ink19.com
 NME Review of Third Meeting At The Third Counter
 KEXP.org review of Third Meeting At The Third Counter

American post-punk music groups
Indie rock musical groups from Washington (state)
K Records artists
Post-punk revival music groups